Carol Ann Toupes (January 31, 1936 – July 24, 2004) was one of the famed Toupes triplets whose birth and early childhood captivated the San Francisco media of the day. She died of liver cancer in her home in San Francisco and is survived by her sisters.

References

1936 births
2004 deaths
Deaths from liver cancer
Deaths from cancer in California